Richie Cummins (born 1991 in Gort, County Galway) is an Irish sportsperson.  He plays hurling with his local club Gort and was a member of the Galway minor inter-county team from 2008 until 2009. Cummins captained Galway to the All-Ireland minor title in 2009.

References

 

1991 births
Living people
Gort hurlers
Galway hurlers